Peter Mahon may refer to:

Peter Mahon (politician) (1909–1980), British Labour Party Member of Parliament
Peter Mahon (judge) (1923–1986), New Zealand barrister and judge
Peter Mahon (priest), Dean of Elphin